Star Trek Pinball is a pinball video game based on the Star Trek franchise, developed by Sales Curve Interactive and published by Interplay for DOS in 1998.

Reception

The game received unfavorable reviews. Next Generation said, "In the end, Star Trek Pinball is one to be avoided – at least until it hits the bargain bins."

References

External links
 

1998 video games
DOS games
DOS-only games
Interplay Entertainment games
Multiplayer and single-player video games
Pinball video games
Video games based on Star Trek: The Original Series
Video games developed in the United Kingdom